Dipuo Bertha Letsatsi-Duba (born 25 September 1965) is a South African politician. She served as Minister of State Security in the first cabinet of President Cyril Ramaphosa from February 2018 to May 2019. She previously served as Deputy Minister of Public Service and Administration.

References 

Living people
1965 births
Place of birth missing (living people)
21st-century South African politicians
Women government ministers of South Africa
Members of the National Assembly of South Africa
Women members of the National Assembly of South Africa

Members of the Limpopo Provincial Legislature